South Carolina elected its members October 14–15, 1816.

See also 
 1816 South Carolina's 9th congressional district special election
 1816 and 1817 United States House of Representatives elections
 List of United States representatives from South Carolina

Notes 

1816
South Carolina
United States House of Representatives